Emma Moszczynski (born 7 June 2001) is a German badminton player. She clinched her first international title at Ukraine International in 2021, pairing Stine Küspert.

Achievement

European Junior Championships 
Mixed doubles

BWF World Tour (1 runner-up) 
The BWF World Tour, which was announced on 19 March 2017 and implemented in 2018, is a series of elite badminton tournaments sanctioned by the Badminton World Federation (BWF). The BWF World Tours are divided into levels of World Tour Finals, Super 1000, Super 750, Super 500, Super 300 (part of the HSBC World Tour), and the BWF Tour Super 100.

Women's doubles

BWF International Challenge/Series (3 titles, 1 runner-up) 
Women's doubles

Mixed doubles

  BWF International Challenge tournament
  BWF International Series tournament
  BWF Future Series tournament

References

External links 
 

2001 births
Living people
Sportspeople from Hamburg
German female badminton players